The Los Angeles Film Critics Association Award for Best Actress was an award given annually by the Los Angeles Film Critics Association. It was first introduced in 1975 to reward the best performance by a leading actress. In 2022, it was announced that the four acting categories would be retired and replaced with two gender neutral categories, with both Best Actor and Best Actress merging into the Best Lead Performance category.

Winners

1970s

1980s

1990s

2000s

2010s

2020s

Multiple Winners
3 wins
Meryl Streep (1981, 1982, 1985)

2 wins
 Sally Hawkins (2008, 2017)
 Holly Hunter (1987, 1993)
 Sissy Spacek (1980, 2001)

See also
 National Board of Review Award for Best Actress
 New York Film Critics Circle Award for Best Actress
 National Society of Film Critics Award for Best Actress

References

Awards disestablished in 2021
A
Film awards for lead actress